Owzun Owbeh or Uzun Owbeh may refer to:
 Owzun Owbeh, East Azerbaijan
 Uzun Owbeh, West Azerbaijan